Wayne is the name of some places in the U.S. state of Wisconsin:
Wayne, Lafayette County, Wisconsin, a town
Wayne, Washington County, Wisconsin, a town
Wayne (community), Wisconsin, an unincorporated community